How to Train Your Dragon: Homecoming is a 2019 computer-animated short film by DreamWorks Animation and directed by Tim Johnson. The holiday special takes place before the epilogue of the third film, and was both released on DVD and aired on NBC on December 3, 2019.

Plot 
As New Berk prepares for Snoggletog, Hiccup and Astrid find out that their children, Zephyr and Nuffink have developed a fear of dragons after finding some of Stoick's old books. To avoid their children bearing the same hatred towards dragons as their ancestors, Astrid suggests bringing back the Snoggletog Pageant that tells the story of how Vikings and dragons made peace. Gobber agrees to help them with the pageant as he sees it as a chance to remind the children of New Berk how much of an impact Stoick had on their village. He casts himself as Stoick and Tuffnut as Hiccup while the real Hiccup creates a mechanical costume that resembles Toothless.

Back in the Hidden World, Toothless draws a picture of Hiccup and New Berk in the sand and shows it to the Light Fury and their children. The Night Lights grow curious about the picture's origin and decide to fly to New Berk while their parents are sleeping. Toothless and the Light Fury wake up in a panic after finding out their children have left and fly off after them. Meanwhile, the Nights Lights arrive on New Berk and sneak around the village as the residents prepare for the pageant. Though they catch a glimpse of Hiccup, they fall back upon coming across Hiccup's Toothless costume. Toothless and the Light Fury eventually find them, but then decide to stay together and watch the pageant from a distance.

Gobber accidentally lights the stage on fire during the performance, which sends Hiccup's costume out of control. Hiccup stumbles and falls off the cliff, but Toothless manages to rescue him and bring him back to the stage. With the smoke from the fire covering the stage, Toothless decides to fill in for Hiccup and helps Gobber end the show by reenacting the moment when he bonded with Hiccup, reminding New Berk and his family of the relationship the dragons had with the Vikings. After the show ends, Zephyr goes backstage to check on her father and ends up face-to-face with Toothless before he flies off with his family. Toothless' courteous and curious personality changes the way Zephyr views dragons.

Despite the pageant's disastrous performance, Hiccup and Astrid see that the youth of New Berk now have a newfound appreciation for both Stoick and the dragons. When they arrive at their home, they find a glowing crystal from the Hidden World and see that the bowl that contained Toothless' favorite fish is empty. They run outside and see Toothless and his family flying away from New Berk, which reminds Hiccup that their loved ones are always close as long as they hold them in their hearts. Astrid thinks their family should return the favor by visiting Toothless and the dragons at the Hidden World.

Cast 
 Jay Baruchel as Hiccup Haddock III
 America Ferrera as Astrid Hofferson
 Craig Ferguson as Gobber the Belch
 Gerard Butler as Stoick the Vast
 Christopher Mintz-Plasse as Fishlegs Ingerman
 Zack Pearlman as Snotlout Jorgenson
 Justin Rupple as Tuffnut Thorston
 Liam Ferguson as Nuffink Haddock
 Madalyn Gonzalez as Zephyr Haddock

Reception 
Emily Ashby of Common Sense Media gave the film four stars out of five, saying "fans who have watched Hiccup's and Toothless's relationship develop over the course of the movie trilogy will find it a heartwarming addition to the saga with poignant sentiments about treasuring the people (and dragons) we love, especially around the holidays."

Notes

References

External links 
 

2019 films
2019 computer-animated films
2010s American animated films
2010s animated short films
2010s children's animated films
Animated films about dragons
DreamWorks Animation animated short films
Films directed by Tim Johnson
Films set on fictional islands
How to Train Your Dragon
NBC television specials
2010s English-language films